Liechtensteinische Landesbank AG is a bank located in Liechtenstein, based in the capital city Vaduz. Since 1993 it has been listed as a company at the Swiss Stock Exchange, with the majority of shares (57.5%) owned by the Liechtenstein state. As the state is in a customs and monetary union with Switzerland and have adopted the Swiss franc as official currency, the monetary policy and money supply is the sole responsibility of the Swiss National Bank (SNB).

Tasks 
Due to Liechtenstein's signed valuta union agreement with Switzerland and its adoption of the Swiss franc as its official currency, the Swiss National Bank performs most duties in administration of macro finance, currency and credit of banks. The National Bank of Liechtenstein however is responsible for the following three tasks:

 "To be secretariat for the Government in the administration of macro finance, currency, credit of Banks within the country."
 "To promote and maintain stability of price within the country; strengthen the efficiency of payments mechanism."
 "To promote and facilitate control on the flows of money to serve the socio-economic development plan of the Liechtenstein."

Directors (Group Chief Executive Officer) 
Eduard Batliner, 1928–1967
Josef Hilti, 1967–1971
Werner Strub, 1971–1979
Karlheinz Heeb, 1979–1996
René Kästli, 1996–1999
Josef Fehr, 2000-2012
Roland Matt, 2012-

General Meeting of Shareholders
Since 1993 the National bank of Liechtenstein has been listed as a company at the Swiss Stock Exchange, with the majority of shares (57.5%) owned by the Liechtenstein state.

See also

Economy of Liechtenstein
Liechtenstein franc
Swiss franc
SARON (Swiss Average Rate Overnight)
Financial Market Authority (Liechtenstein) (FMA)

References

External links

 Official site: National bank of Liechtenstein
 Swiss and World Interest Rates, updated by ForexMotion.com.

Liechtenstein
National Bank
National Bank
Banks established in 1861
1861 establishments in Liechtenstein
Companies listed on the SIX Swiss Exchange